Pedro Antonio Reyes González (born 13 November 1972) is a Chilean football manager and former defender.

Playing career
He was capped 55 times and scored four goals for the Chile national team between 1994 and 2001, including four games at the 1998 FIFA World Cup.   In that tournament, Chile played to a 2-2 tie with Italy. In the 2000 Summer Olympics, Reyes helped Chile capture the bronze in football.

He retired on 1 May 2008. In his last match, he played with his World Cup's teammates Iván Zamorano, José Luis Sierra, Jorge Contreras, Javier Margas among others. The match was in Estadio Regional, Antofagasta.

Coaching career
He has mainly developed his career as assistant of José Luis Sierra in Colo-Colo, Unión Española, Al-Ittihad. Shabab Al-Ahli and Palestino.

In December 2022, he assumed as coach of the Unión Española youth team.

Honors

Club
Colo-Colo
 Primera División de Chile (4): 1993, 1996, 1997–C, 1998
 Copa Chile (2): 1994, 1996

International
 Summer Olympic Games (1): Bronze Medal in 2000 Sydney

References

External links

1972 births
Living people
People from Antofagasta
Chilean footballers
Chilean expatriate footballers
Chile international footballers
1998 FIFA World Cup players
1999 Copa América players
Olympic footballers of Chile
Olympic bronze medalists for Chile
Footballers at the 2000 Summer Olympics
2001 Copa América players
C.D. Antofagasta footballers
Chilean Primera División players
Colo-Colo footballers
Universidad de Chile footballers
Deportes La Serena footballers
Audax Italiano footballers
Unión Española footballers
Ligue 1 players
AJ Auxerre players
Paraguayan Primera División players
Club Olimpia footballers
Chilean expatriate sportspeople in France
Chilean expatriate sportspeople in Paraguay
Expatriate footballers in France
Expatriate footballers in Paraguay
Olympic medalists in football
Medalists at the 2000 Summer Olympics
Outfield association footballers who played in goal
Association football defenders
Chilean football managers
Chilean expatriate football managers
Chilean expatriate sportspeople in Saudi Arabia
Chilean expatriate sportspeople in the United Arab Emirates
Expatriate football managers in Saudi Arabia
Expatriate football managers in the United Arab Emirates